24 Hour Restaurant Battle is a Food Network reality based cooking television series hosted by Scott Conant that features two teams competing against each other for a shot at their own restaurant.

Series overview
Opening: "It's the ultimate dream for master chefs and home cooks alike to open your own restaurant. Now two teams will compete to transform an empty space into the restaurant they've always wanted. But they'll have to do this in 24 hours. Once the doors open, they'll be judged by their customers, a panel of experts, and me, Scott Conant, chef and restaurateur. It's an all out war of culinary skill, business savvy, and pure determination. This is 24 Hour Restaurant Battle...It's two teams one dream and 24 hours to make it happen".

Criteria: 24 Hours until the doors open: 1. Create a concept. 2. Plan Menu. 3. Design and shop for front of the house. 4. Manage kitchen and waitstaff.

In each episode, two teams of two or three people compete. Each team must turn a blank space into a restaurant in 24 hours. The teams are responsible for a concept, decor, and food. Each team's menu must include at least one Appetizer, Entrée and Dessert, but there is no maximum limit for any course as long as it fits within their budget. Both teams get a $4,000 budget for food and decor. Each team also gets painters to color the walls, one sous chef to help assist the cooking, and waiters to seat people at tables and deliver food. After 24 hours, the restaurant's doors are open to diners who get to choose the restaurant they would like to attend based on the menu and decor. Four judges eat at both restaurants and Conant determines a winner based on the "concept, execution and viability" of the restaurant. The winning team gets $10,000 to invest into creating their own restaurant.

Note: For episodes starting on September 15, 2010, the teams received $5,000 instead of $4,000 and Geoffrey Zakarian was designated as the head judge.

Judges
The judges change each episode (except for Scott Conant), though they are from a selection of 9 restaurateurs and critics:

 Karine Bakhoum - Food critic
Alison Brod - Restaurant trend expert, restaurant publicist (Alison Brod PR)
Jason Denton - Chef
Gabriella Gershenson - Food writer/editor for Saveur magazine
Ben Leventhal - Food blogger
 Drew Nieporent -
 Marcus Samuelsson - Chef/Restaurateur
Steve Schussler -
David Sax - Author of Save the Deli: In Search of Perfect Pastrami, Crusty Rye, and the Heart of Jewish Delicatessen
 Geoffrey Zakarian - Chef/NYC Restaurateur

Episodes

Season 1 (2010)

Season 2 (2011)

References

External links
 Official Site

2010 American television series debuts
2011 American television series endings
2010s American cooking television series
Food Network original programming
Food reality television series
2010s American reality television series
Television series by CBS Studios